Alexis Ossa (born 6 August 1989) is a Colombian football midfielder who currently plays for Atlético Pantoja. After a lengthy career in Colombia, he ventured abroad in Venezuela, Latvia and the Dominican Republic.

References

1993 births
Living people
Colombian footballers
Envigado F.C. players
Independiente Medellín footballers
Jaguares de Córdoba footballers
Cúcuta Deportivo footballers
Atlético Bucaramanga footballers
Llaneros de Guanare players
BFC Daugavpils players
Atlético Pantoja players
Categoría Primera A players
Categoría Primera B players
Venezuelan Primera División players
Latvian Higher League players
Association football midfielders
Colombian expatriate footballers
Expatriate footballers in Venezuela
Colombian expatriate sportspeople in Venezuela
Expatriate footballers in Latvia
Colombian expatriate sportspeople in Latvia
Expatriate footballers in the Dominican Republic
Colombian expatriate sportspeople in the Dominican Republic
Sportspeople from Antioquia Department